Chiyozakura Teruo  (born 14 April 1950 as Teruo Saito) is former a sumo wrestler from Imakane, Hokkaidō, Japan. He made his professional debut in March 1966, and reached the top division in September 1976. His highest rank was maegashira 5. Upon retirement from active competition he became an elder in the Japan Sumo Association under the name Fujigane. He left the Sumo Association in March 1979.

The Chiyozakura shikona was later used by the jūryō division wrestler Chiyozakura Ukyo from 2010 until 2012.

Career record

See also
Glossary of sumo terms
List of past sumo wrestlers
List of sumo tournament second division champions

References

1950 births
Living people
Japanese sumo wrestlers
Sumo people from Hokkaido
Kokonoe stable sumo wrestlers